"Angels, Roses and Rain" is a single by American country music artist Dickey Lee. Released in January 1976, it was the first single from his album Angels, Roses and Rain. The song peaked at number 9 on the Billboard Hot Country Singles chart. It also reached number 1 on the RPM Country Tracks chart in Canada.

Chart performance

References

1976 singles
Dickey Lee songs
Songs written by Bob Morrison (songwriter)
1976 songs